$0 may refer to:

 the program name stored in argv[0], in Shell scripts
 the current Document Object Model (DOM) node, in Chrome web browser
 the polymorphic return value, in PL/pgSQL